Andrews is a ghost town in Harney County, Oregon, United States. It is located south of Steens Mountain and near the Alvord Desert.

History
The community was named for Peter Andrews, who settled in the area about 1880. A post office was established on Andrews' property in 1890. The post office was moved north a short distance in 1900 and called "Wildhorse" or "Wild Horse". Locals referred to it as "Wild Hog", however, so the postmaster changed the name to honor his friend Andrews.

At its peak the community had about 150 residents.  However, the population of Andrews slowly declined until only one house remained. When it burned down in 1996, the community became a ghost town.

In 2011, artist John Simpkins moved into the abandoned school at Andrews.  He set up residence in the teacher's cottage and turned the schoolhouse into his studio.  He spent nearly a decade living and working at the school until 2020 when the property owner ordered him to vacate the buildings.

Climate
According to the Köppen Climate Classification system, Andrews has a semi-arid climate, abbreviated "BSk" on climate maps.

See also
List of ghost towns in Oregon

References

External links
Photo of Andrews school by chipsbuttie
Historic images of Andrews from Salem Public Library
Andrews listing on ghosttowns.com

 

Ghost towns in Oregon
Populated places established in 1880
Former populated places in Harney County, Oregon
1890 establishments in Oregon
Populated places established in 1890